The  is a professional wrestling world heavyweight championship owned by the New Japan Pro-Wrestling (NJPW) promotion. The championship was created on March 1, 2021 by the unification of the IWGP Heavyweight Championship and the IWGP Intercontinental Championship. The current champion is Kazuchika Okada, who is in his second reign.

History 

In 2019, when he was IWGP Intercontinental Champion, Tetsuya Naito declared his intention of making history by becoming the first to hold the IWGP Heavyweight Championship and the Intercontinental Championship at the same time. By the end of the year, Jay White, who had won the Intercontinental Championship from Naito, and Kota Ibushi, who was the next challenger for the Heavyweight Championship, also expressed the same desire. After a fan vote, it was decided that Naito, White, Ibushi, and Heavyweight Champion Kazuchika Okada would compete at Wrestle Kingdom 14 on January 4–5, 2020, where one would end up with both titles. Naito achieved the feat to become the first "Double Champion" and the two titles were defended together since (apart from one time). During 2020, Naito said his original intention was for the titles to be defended separately. He requested for this, or otherwise for the titles to be unified, but no change happened. 

After Ibushi won the titles from Naito at Wrestle Kingdom 15 on January 4, 2021, he expressed his desire for the titles to be unified. On March 1, 2021, with Ibushi still champion, the unification of the titles to create the new IWGP World Heavyweight Championship was officially announced, with Ibushi as the inaugural World Heavyweight Champion. After the announcement, Ibushi, who was scheduled to face El Desperado at the NJPW 49th Anniversary Show on March 4, 2021 in a non-title match, requested for the match to be for the Double Championship. His request was granted with the title unification delayed until after the match, of which the winner would be final Double Champion and, therefore, the inaugural World Heavyweight Champion. Ibushi won the match.

With the announcement of the new championship was the announcement of a new championship belt. Until the new belt was ready, Ibushi continued to hold the old IWGP Heavyweight and IWGP Intercontinental Championship belts. The new belt was eventually revealed and presented to the champion Ibushi in a presentation ceremony on March 30, 2021. Its design incorporated the past belt designs of the two old titles.

Reigns 

Kota Ibushi was the inaugural champion, had the shortest reign at 31 days, and is also the oldest champion, winning the title at 38 years and 255 days old. Kazuchika Okada has most reign with two. Will Ospreay was the youngest at 27. Shingo Takagi had the longest reign at 211 days and three successful title defenses.

Kazuchika Okada is the current champion in his record-setting second reign. He defeated Jay White on January 4, 2023 at Wrestle Kingdom 17 in Tokyo, Japan.

Combined reigns

References

External links 
 Championship history on official website 
 Championship history on official website 

New Japan Pro-Wrestling championships
World heavyweight wrestling championships